Ragle Ranch Regional Park is a regional park in Sebastopol, California, U.S.A. that is maintained by the Sonoma County Regional Parks Department. The park entrance is at 500 Ragle Road, and the day use fee is $7 per vehicle.

Facilities and features
The park features a paved loop path  in circumference, plus secondary paved paths associated with a par course. Unpaved trails suitable for hiking, cycling, or horseback riding provide access to Atascadero Creek and its associated wetlands. The tennis courts, volleyball courts, baseball diamond, and six soccer fields are all located on the east side of the park, within sight of Ragle Road. The park includes both a Veterans Memorial Grove and a Peace Garden.  Other amenities include a children's playground, picnic tables, barbecues, a gazebo, bathrooms, and a dog park. There is a small pond behind the bathrooms.

Gallery

See also
List of Sonoma County Regional Parks facilities

References

External links

Regional parks in California
Parks in Sonoma County, California
Sebastopol, California